The Atlatzi River is a river in the Pacific Ranges in the Central Coast region of British Columbia, Canada, flowing southwest into the lower Kingcome River, which feeds the head of Kingcome Inlet. It had been called Back River on a 1919 map of British Columbia.

See also
List of British Columbia rivers

References

Rivers of the Pacific Ranges
Rivers of the Central Coast of British Columbia